Companions is an EP by Ohio based Pop Punk band Mixtapes (band). It was released on vinyl with Maps (Mixtapes album) via Animal Style records as Maps & Companions. It features two new songs and two old songs from Maps, "And if We Both Fail?" and "OrangeYellow", as well as "Soups Whatever" from their 2010 release A Short Collection of Short Songs (EP), were re-recorded into full-band tracks.

Track listing

Personnel
Ryan Rockwell – vocals, guitar, keyboard
Maura Weaver – vocals, guitar
Michael Remley – bass
Boone Haley – drums

References

2011 albums